The list of drainage basins by area identifies basins (also known as "catchments" or, in North American usage, "watersheds"), sorted by area, which drain to oceans, mediterranean seas, rivers, lakes and other water bodies. It includes drainage basins which do not flow to the ocean (endorheic basins). It includes oceanic sea drainage basins which have hydrologically coherent areas (oceanic seas are set by IHO convention).

The oceans drain approximately 83% of the land in the world. The other 17% – an area larger than the basin of the Arctic Ocean – drains to internal endorheic basins. There are also substantial areas of the world that do not "drain" in the commonly understood sense. In polar deserts, much of the snowfall sublimates directly into the air and does not melt into flowing water, while in tropical deserts precipitation may evaporate before joining any substantial water course. These areas can still be included in topographically defined basins the hypothetical flow of water (or ice), and thus nutrients or pollutants, over the surface of the ground (or ice sheet) is considered. For example, the Antarctic ice sheet can be divided into basins, and most of Libya is included in the Mediterranean Sea basin even though almost no water from the interior actually reaches the sea.

Basins

See also
List of rivers by discharge
List of rivers by dissolved load
List of rivers by length
Triple divide

Notes

References

External links

Lake database

Lists by area

'
Hydrology lists